Singkawang Grand Mall (abbreviated as SGM) is a shopping mall in Singkawang, West Kalimantan, Indonesia. This mall was officially opened in 2015 and since that time become the largest shopping mall in West Kalimantan. The building has twelve floors, with the lowest five floors allocated for shopping mall and the rest are for hotel.

References

Shopping malls in Indonesia
Buildings and structures in West Kalimantan